Nancy Osbaldeston (born 1989) is an English ballet dancer who is currently a principal dancer with the Royal Ballet of Flanders.

Osbaldeston was born in Cuckfield, England. She started dancing at age 3, and appeared in Birmingham Royal Ballet's The Nutcracker at age 6. She trained at Roshe School, Cardwell Theatre School and English National Ballet School. She later won the third prize of Young British Dancer of the Year.

Osbaldeston joined the English National Ballet as an Artist in 2008. She won the Emerging Dancer Competition in 2013 by dancing an extract from Don Quixote and John Neumeier's Bach Suite no. 2. She was promoted to First Artist the same year.

In 2014, Osbaldeston moved to Antwerp to join the Royal Ballet of Flanders as a demi-soloist. She was named soloist in 2016 and principal dancer in 2017. Her repertoire includes works by Sidi Larbi Cherkaoui, Pina Bausch, Akram Khan, William Forsythe, Marcia Haydée, Hans van Manen, Jiří Kylián and John Cranko. She had also performed with the Bavarian State Ballet as a guest, appearing in "Rubies" from George Balanchine's Jewels and as Marie in Neumeier's The Nutcracker.

References

Living people
1989 births
People from Cuckfield
English ballerinas
English National Ballet dancers
English expatriates in Belgium
21st-century British dancers
21st-century ballet dancers